Jaume Antoni Munar Clar (born 5 May 1997, in Majorca) is a Spanish professional tennis player. Munar has a career-high ATP singles ranking of No. 52 achieved on 20 May 2019. He also has a career-high ATP doubles ranking of No. 149 achieved on 10 February 2020. He is known for excessive grunting and constantly arguing with umpires.

Juniors
On the junior tour, Munar had a career-high combined ranking of No. 3, achieved on 26 January 2015. Munar reached the 2014 French Open Boys' Final, where he lost to Andrey Rublev. On his way to the final, he defeated top juniors such as Michael Mmoh and Quentin Halys. He also won the Junior Davis Cup 2013.

Professional career

2015: Maiden ATP win
He won his first ATP Tour match at the 2015 German Open against Guillermo García-López, when the world No. 31 retired after three games, and the result launched Munar into the top 500 for the first time.

2018: Major debut
At the 2018 French Open and in only his ninth pro tour match and his second major, Munar came from two sets down to defeat compatriot David Ferrer in the first round. He lost in the second round against Novak Djokovic.

2019: Maiden top-10 win, Masters debut, top 60
In Morocco he defeated top seed Alexander Zverev for his first top-10 win, to reach the quarterfinals.

2021: Maiden ATP final
He reached his first ATP singles final at the 2021 Andalucia Open in Marbella, Spain where he lost to compatriot Pablo Carreno Busta.

2022: Second top-10 win, top 60 year-end ranking
At the Japan Open, he stunned the top seed and world No. 3, Casper Ruud, for his second top-10 win (first was also against a No. 3, Alexander Zverev in 2019 Marrakech).

2023
At the 2023 Chile Open he stunned top seed Lorenzo Musetti to reach the quarterfinals. Next he defeated Thiago Monteiro to reach the semifinals in close to two years since Parma in 2021.

Performance timelines

Singles 
Current through the 2022 US Open.

ATP career finals

Singles: 1 (1 runner-up)

Doubles: 1 (1 runner-up)

Challenger and Futures finals

Singles: 24 (15–9)

Doubles: 14 (11–3)

Junior Grand Slam finals: 2

Singles: 1 (1 runner–up)

Doubles: 1 (1 title)

Record against other players

Record against top 10 players
Munar's record against those who have been ranked in the top 10, with active players in boldface.

Top 10 wins
He has a  record against players who were, at the time the match was played, ranked in the top 10

*

Notes

References

External links
 
 

1997 births
Living people
Spanish male tennis players
Sportspeople from Mallorca
French Open junior champions
Tennis players from the Balearic Islands
Grand Slam (tennis) champions in boys' doubles
People from Santanyí